George Banda-Thomas is a Sierra Leonean politician.

He was appointed Minister of Trade and Industry under President Ahmad Tejan Kabbah. Banda-Thomas supported presidential candidate Charles Margai at the September 2005 SLPP Convention which cost him his job when Margai lost the election. He was later given a new appointment as Sierra Leone's Minister of Internal Affairs.

References 

Living people
Alumni of St. Edward's Secondary School, Freetown
Year of birth missing (living people)
Trade ministers
Government ministers of Sierra Leone
Sierra Leone People's Party politicians